The Meizu M3S is a smartphone designed and produced by the Chinese manufacturer Meizu, which runs on Flyme OS, Meizu's modified Android operating system. It is a current model of the M series. It was unveiled on June 13, 2016 in Beijing.

History 
On May 25, 2016 it has been reported that a new Meizu device has been certified by the Chinese telecommunication authority TENAA, the Chinese equivalent to the American Federal Communications Commission. According to the certification information, the new device should feature a 5-inch display with a resolution of 720 by 1280 pixels.

In the beginning of June 2016, there were statements on Chinese social media that the upcoming device could be called Meizu M3S. Furthermore, a launch event for the new device on June 13, 2016, was announced.

Release 

As announced, the M3S was released in Beijing on June 13, 2016.

Pre-orders for the M3S began after the launch event on June 13, 2016.

Features

Flyme 

The Meizu M3S was released with an updated version of Flyme OS, a modified operating system based on Android Lollipop. It features an alternative, flat design and improved one-handed usability.

Hardware and design

The Meizu M3S features a MediaTek MTK 6750 system-on-a-chip with an array of eight ARM Cortex-A53 CPU cores, an ARM Mali-T860 MP2 GPU and 2 GB or 3 GB of RAM.
The M3S reaches a score of 38451 points on the  AnTuTu benchmark.

The M3S is available in four different colors (grey, silver, champagne gold and rose gold) and comes with either 2 GB of RAM and 16 GB of internal storage or 3 GB of RAM and 32 GB of internal storage.

The Meizu M3S has a full-metal body, which measures  x  x  and weighs . It has a slate form factor, being rectangular with rounded corners and has only one central physical button at the front.
Unlike most other Android smartphones, the M3S doesn't have capacitive buttons nor on-screen buttons. The functionality of these keys is implemented using a technology called mBack, which makes use of gestures with the physical button. The M3S further extends this button by a fingerprint sensor called mTouch.

The M3S features a fully laminated 5-inch IPS multi-touch capacitive touchscreen display with a HD resolution of 720 by 1080 pixels. The pixel density of the display is 293 ppi.

In addition to the touchscreen input and the front key, the device has volume/zoom control buttons and the power/lock button on the right side, a 3.5mm TRS audio jack on the top and a microUSB (Micro-B type) port on the bottom for charging and connectivity.

The Meizu M3S has two cameras. The rear camera has a resolution of 13 MP, a ƒ/2.2 aperture, a 5-element lens, phase-detection autofocus and an LED flash.
The front camera has a resolution of 5 MP, a ƒ/2.0 aperture and a 4-element lens.

See also
 Meizu
 Comparison of smartphones

References

External links
 Official product page Meizu

Android (operating system) devices
Mobile phones introduced in 2016
M3s
Discontinued smartphones